Shehri, (Arabic: شحرية), also known as Jibbali ("mountain" language in Omani Arabic), is a Modern South Arabian language. It is spoken by a small native population inhabiting the coastal towns and the mountains and wilderness areas upland from Salalah, located in the Dhofar Governorate in southwestern Oman.

Overview
Shehri (Jibbali, Geblet, Sheret, Šehri, Šhauri, Shahari, Jibali, Ehkili, Qarawi, and Garawi) is spoken along a dialect continuum that includes Western Jibbali, Central Jibbali, and Eastern Jibbali. The dialect used by the few inhabitants of Al-Hallaniyah in the Khuriya Muriya Islands is sometimes known as 'Baby' Jibbali. Speakers generally live a semi-nomadic culture, rearing cows and camels in the mountains. The dialects themselves contain only minor variances and are highly intelligible.

Like most Modern South Arabian dialect speakers in Oman and Yemen, many Shehri speakers are bilingual in local dialects of Arabic especially the Dhofari dialect. In addition, it is primarily a spoken language, and there is no tradition of writing or publishing in the language. Pressure from Arabic has forced many changes in the language, so much so that young speakers use noticeably different grammar.

Phonology

Consonants 

  is typically only heard in word-final position, and is not considered as phonemic.

Vowels 

Grammar
The vowel system is made up of an 8-member set, containing the normal Semitic i-u-a, along with tense and lax vowels, and a central vowel.  The vowel set is: i, e, Ó, Í, a, Ã, o, u. The difference between the long and short vowels is not always just phonological.

Noun markers are a combination of Arabic, Ethiopian, and unique Modern South Arabian grammar markers. Nouns have an either masculine or feminine gender. Feminine markers use the endings of –(V)t or –h, as in Arabic. Unlike Arabic, the dual number marker is not used in nouns, and is instead replaced by a suffix of the numeral 2 itself. Dual pronouns are no longer used by the youth, replaced by plural pronouns.

Simple verb conjugations have two separate classes, with differing conjugations for perfect, imperfect, and subjunctive cases. Verbal clauses always take the order of VSO (Verb–subject–object) or SVO (Subject–verb–object). If the subject is an independent pronoun, it is placed before the verb. Guttural verbs have their own pattern. Verb classifications are intensive-conative, causative, reflexive (with infixed -t-), and causative-reflexive. In future verbs, a preverb ha-/h- precedes the subjunctive.

The numbers 1 and 2 act as adjectives. Between 3 and 10, masculine numbers enumerate feminine nouns, and feminine numbers enumerate masculine nouns. There is gender agreement between the number and nouns from 11 to 19. Beyond that, the structure is tens, “and”, and the unit. This is similar to Arabic counting. Livestock counting presents a special case that deviates from Arabic, instead using an ancient Bedouin system. Beyond 13, the noun used is either plural or singular.

References

Further reading 
 
 
 Marie-Claude Simeone-Simelle. 1997. The Modern South Arabian Languages. In Robert Hetzron (ed.), The Semitic Languages, 378–423. London &New York: Routledge.
 Moseley, C. (2010). Encyclopedia of the world's endangered languages. London: Routledge. Middle East and North Africa

External links 
 ELAR archive of Shehri language documentation materials
 The pronunciation of the letters included in the Shehri language

Languages of Oman
Modern South Arabian languages